Empire Buffalo was a  Design 1105 cargo ship which was built in 1919 as Eglantine by Skinner & Eddy for the United States Shipping Board (USSB). She was sold in 1933 to the Lykes Brothers-Ripley Steamship Corporation. In 1940 she was sold to the Ministry of War Transport (MoWT) and renamed Empire Buffalo.

Description
Eglantine was built by Skinner & Eddy. She was yard number 68. Eglantine was launched on 25 October 1919 and completed in November 1919.

The engine was built by Hooven, Owens & Rentschler, Hamilton, Ohio.

In 1930, Eglantine was recorded on Lloyd's Register as having a GRT of 6,325 with a NRT of 3,972. In 1938, she was recorded as having a GRT of 6,312 and a NRT of 4,456. In 1940, Empire Buffalo was recorded on Lloyds Register as having a GRT of 6,404 and a NRT of 4,618. Other sources list her as having a GRT of 6,374.

Career
Eglantine's port of registry was Seattle. She was operated by the USSB until 1933 when she was sold to Lykes Brothers-Ripley Steamship Corporation. Her port of registry was changed to New Orleans. Eglantine served with Lykes Brothers until 1940 when she was sold to the MoWT and renamed Empire Buffalo.

She was operated under the management of Lyle Shipping Co Ltd. Her port of Registry was London. Empire Buffalo was a member of a number of convoys during the Second World War.

SC 34
Convoy SC 34 departed Sydney, Nova Scotia on 10 June 1941 and arrived at the Clyde on 29 June. Empire Buffalo was carrying a cargo of bombs, shells, steel, trucks and a general cargo. She was to proceed to the Mersey for orders.

SC 46
Convoy SC 46 departed Sydney on 24 September 1941. Empire Buffalo was carrying a cargo of phosphates.
 The convoy arrived at Liverpool on 10 October.

SC 71
Convoy SC 71 departed Halifax, Nova Scotia on 22 February 1942 and arrived at Liverpool on 10 March. Empire Buffalo was carrying general cargo bound for Newport, Monmouthshire.

Thirteen of the crew were killed, including the Captain, John Hill. Empire Buffalo was on a voyage from Kingston to New Orleans in ballast. Those lost on Empire Buffalo are commemorated at the Tower Hill Memorial, London.

Official Numbers and Code Letters

Official Numbers were a forerunner to IMO Numbers. Eglantine had the United States Official Number 219278. Empire Buffalo had the UK Official Number 168018.

Eglantine used the Code Letters LTVD until 1934, when they were changed to KOPT. Empire Buffalo used the Code Letters GLRR.

References

1919 ships
Ships built by Skinner & Eddy
Steamships of the United States
Merchant ships of the United States
Empire ships
Design 1105 ships of the Ministry of War Transport
Steamships of the United Kingdom
Ships sunk by German submarines in World War II
World War II shipwrecks in the Caribbean Sea
Maritime incidents in May 1942